The Women's individual pursuit was held on 20 October 2017.

Results

Qualifying
The fastest 4 competitors qualify for the medal finals.

Finals
The final classification is determined in the medal finals.

References

Women's individual pursuit
European Track Championships – Women's individual pursuit